Victorian Football Club can refer to either of two defunct Australian rules football clubs:

 Victorian Football Club (South Australia), a defunct Australian rules football club based in Adelaide, South Australia
 Victorian Football Club (Western Australia), a defunct Australian rules football club based in Perth, Western Australia